Suttle is a surname. Notable people with the surname include:

Charles F. Suttle, (1834-1862), American slave-owner
Curtis A. Suttle, Canadian microbiologist
Dorwin Wallace Suttle (1906–2001), United States federal judge
Eugene Francis Suttle (Frank) (1909–1989), Irish comptroller and auditor general 1964–1973
Felicia Mabuza-Suttle (born 1950), South African entrepreneur and talk show hostess
Jim Suttle, American politician in Nebraska
Kellie Suttle (born 1973), American track and field athlete
Ken Suttle (1928–2005), English cricketer
Saint Suttle (1870–1932), American performer, composer

See also
Suttles